Bakos, also known as Bacus, is a neighborhood in Alexandria, Egypt.

The former Egyptian president Gamal Abdel Nasser was born in 1918 in Bakos.

Gamal Abdel Nasser
The neighbourhood is known for the fact that it is the birthplace of Gamal Abdel Nasser, who lead the Egyptian Revolution of 1952 to topple a line of Ottoman kings in Egypt, later ousting his associate Mohammed Naguib and consolidating absolute power. He issued a number of wide-reaching reforms in Egypt and his popularity enjoyed a large boost due to his adept and skilful managing of the Suez Crisis. During the Cold War, he was a founder of the Non-Aligned Movement and frequently used the nations (namely the Soviet Union and the United States of America) who wanted his support in the Arab World to his advantage. Despite resigning after a defeat by Israel in the Six Day War, he was reinstated by popular demand and when he died, there was an outpouring of grief in the Arab World. He was succeeded by Anwar Sadat. Even today in Egypt, there is a large amount of nostalgia for him and his polices, called Nasserist.

See also
 Neighborhoods in Alexandria

References

Populated places in Alexandria Governorate
Neighbourhoods of Alexandria
Cities in Egypt